Strange Horizons is an online speculative fiction magazine. It also features speculative poetry and nonfiction in every issue, including reviews, essays, interviews, and roundtables.

History and profile
It was launched in September 2000, and publishes new material (fiction, articles, reviews, poetry, and/or art) 51 weeks of the year, with an emphasis on "new, underrepresented, and global voices." The magazine was founded by writer and editor Mary Anne Mohanraj. It has a staff of approximately sixty volunteers, and is unusual among professional speculative fiction magazines in being funded entirely by donations, holding annual fund drives.

Editors-in-chief 
 Mary Anne Mohanraj, 2000–2003
 Susan Marie Groppi, 2004–2010
 Niall Harrison, 2010–2017
 Jane Crowley and Kate Dollarhyde, 2017–2019
 Vanessa Rose Phin, 2019–2021
 Gautam Bhatia, 2021–present

Awards 

Susan Marie Groppi won the World Fantasy Special Award: Non-Professional in 2010 for her work as Editor-in-Chief on Strange Horizons. The magazine itself was a finalist for the Best Website Hugo Award in 2002 and 2005, and for the Hugo Award for Best Semiprozine every year from 2013 through 2022. Strange Horizons won The Community Award for Outstanding Efforts in Service of Inclusion and Equitable Practice in Genre, presented by the Ignyte Awards, in 2020. 

The short story "The House Beyond Your Sky" by Benjamin Rosenbaum, published in 2006 in the magazine, was nominated for a 2007 Hugo Award for Best Short Story. "Selkie Stories Are For Losers" by Sofia Samatar was nominated for a Hugo Award for Best Short Story in 2014. Other stories in Strange Horizons have been nominated for the Nebula and other awards. Three stories published in Strange Horizons have won the Theodore Sturgeon Award.

Awards to magazine and editors

Content

See also
 Fantasy fiction magazine
 Science fiction magazine

References

External links
 
 

Fantasy fiction magazines
Magazines established in 2000
Magazines published in Utah
Online literary magazines published in the United States
Poetry magazines published in the United States
Science fiction magazines published in the United States
Science fiction webzines
Weekly magazines published in the United States